Gyeongheung Eo clan was one of the Korean clans. Their Bon-gwan was located in Kyonghung County, North Hamgyong Province. According to research in 2000, the number people within the Gyeongheung Eo clan was 542. He was a grandchild of Eo Seok gyu and served as the Menxia Shilang in Ming dynasty. He immigrated to Kyonghung and began the Gyeongheung Eo clan.

See also 
 Korean clan names of foreign origin

References

External links 
 

 
Korean clan names of Chinese origin